The following is a list of Schools in Patna, Bihar, India.

List of Schools

See also
 Education in Bihar
 List of educational institutions in Bihar
 List of educational institutions in Patna

References

External links
List of best Schools of Patna
Top 10 Schools in Patna

Patna
 
Patna-related lists